The 2000–01 Midland Football Alliance season was the seventh in the history of Midland Football Alliance, a football competition in England.

Clubs and league table
The league featured 20 clubs from the previous season, along with two new clubs:
Stafford Town, promoted from the West Midlands (Regional) League
Stourbridge, relegated from the Southern Football League

League table

References

External links
 Midland Football Alliance

2000–01
8